Joyce Hwang is an American architect whose approach to architecture includes a special focus on non-human users of the built environment.

Career
Hwang is an associate professor in the Department of Architecture at the University at Buffalo. She is also the Director of Ants of the Prairie, "an office of architectural practice and research that focuses on confronting contemporary ecological conditions through creative means." Ants of the Prairie was noted by the Architectural League of NY as an Emerging Voice of 2014.

References

Year of birth missing (living people)
Living people
American women architects
University at Buffalo faculty
American women academics
21st-century American women